L'Épinay-le-Comte is a former commune in the Orne department in north-western France. On 1 January 2016, it was merged into the new commune of Passais Villages.

Facilities in the village include the mairie, a salles des fêtes, and a bar / restaurant: Bar du Pecheur.

See also 

 Communes of the Orne department

References 

Epinaylecomte